Mitchell David Lively (born September 7, 1985) is an American professional baseball pitcher for El Águila de Veracruz of the Mexican League. He previously played for the Hokkaido Nippon-Ham Fighters of Nippon Professional Baseball (NPB) and the CTBC Brothers of the Chinese Professional Baseball League (CPBL).

Early career
Lively was born in Susanville, California and attended Lassen High School. Lively attended California State University Sacramento, where he played baseball and football, where he was the punter. He averaged 40.83 yards per punt, the second-best career average in school history among punters with at least 50 attempts. In baseball, Lively had a 4.95 ERA in 14 games in 2004 and, after not playing in 2005, was 0–6 with a 7.42 ERA in 2006. During his final college season, 2007, he was 1–3 with eight saves and an 8.07 ERA. He led the Western Athletic Conference in saves.

Professional career

Colorado Rockies
Despite his lackluster numbers, the Colorado Rockies drafted him in the 16th round of the 2007 Major League Baseball Draft, two picks ahead of pitcher Steve Edlefsen. He was signed by scout Gary Wilson.  He was 1–0 with two runs (one earned) in 6 2/3 innings pitched for the Casper Rockies that year and was released following the season.

San Francisco Giants
He signed with the independent San Angelo Colts of the United Baseball League for 2008, pitching 11 games and earning four saves, posting a 2.13 ERA and striking out 18 batters in 12 2/3 innings before signing a contract with the San Francisco Giants partway through the year. To finish the year, he pitched for the AZL Giants, allowing no runs in 2 2/3 innings, and Augusta Greenjackets, going 1–0 with a 1.42 ERA in 10 games. Overall, he had a 1.61 mark in 23 games. 2009 was split between Augusta, with whom he allowed 9 runs in 17 2/3 frames, the San Jose Giants (5.23 ERA in 16 games) and the Connecticut Defenders, with whom he had a 0.70 ERA in 14 games. Overall, he had a 3.23 mark in 43 games. He spent 2010 with Augusta (going 4–2 with a save and a 4.89 ERA in 24 games) and the Richmond Flying Squirrels (going 2–4 with three saves and a 3.90 ERA in 23 games). He had a 4.41 ERA in 47 games overall. In 2011, he had a 2.14 ERA with nine saves in 56 appearances between San Jose and Richmond and in 2012, his first year at Triple-A Fresno, he was 8–4 with a 2.99 ERA in 47 relief appearances. He converted to starting pitching for 2013, going 7–5 with a 4.72 ERA in 30 games (20 starts) for Fresno. With the Navegantes del Magallanes during the Venezuelan Winter League, he went 6–1 with a 1.46 ERA and won Pitcher of the Year.

In late 2013, he adopted a windmill windup—rare in modern baseball, but reminiscent of players like Satchel Paige and Bob Feller—which he used through 2014. He began the 2014 campaign in the Giants system, but after posting a 5.08 ERA in 22 games (15 starts) for Fresno, he was released.

Washington Nationals
In late July, the Nationals signed Lively and assigned him to the Triple-A Syracuse Chiefs. He was 5–2 with a 3.86 ERA in 9 games (7 starts) for them and 11–6 with a 4.72 ERA in 31 games overall. He also averaged 8.2 strikeouts per nine innings. After being granted free agency in November, the Nationals re-signed him to a minor league contract on December 16.

Hokkaido Nippon Ham Fighters
Lively was released by the Nationals at the end of the 2015 season, when he went to play for the Hokkaido Nippon Ham Fighters of the Pacific League in Japan. He made 16 appearances for the Fighters (all in relief), pitched 18 2/3 innings, didn't have a decision, had an ERA of 5.30, struck out 22.

Mexican Baseball (2016–present)

Vaqueros Laguna
On April 1, 2016, Lively signed with the Vaqueros Laguna of the Mexican Baseball League. He was released on April 28, 2016.

Broncos de Reynosa
On May 2, 2016, Lively signed with the Broncos de Reynosa of the Mexican Baseball League.

Bravos de León
On March 7, 2017, Lively announced that he would return to the Mexican Baseball League with the Bravos de León. He had a record of 7–2, and led the team in ERA (2.41). He tied for the team lead with 60 strikeouts, despite missing part of the season with an injury. He became a fan favourite in León, and acquired the nickname "The Boss".

Venados de Mazatlán
He remained in Mexico to play for the Venados de Mazatlán of the Mexican Pacific League for the 2017–2018 season. He had a 9–2 record, and the nine wins led the league. He had eight straight wins at one point in the season. His 2.50 ERA was second-lowest in the league, and his 63 strikeouts were second-best in the league. He was named Pitcher of the Year by the Mexican Pacific League. Following the conclusion of the 2018 CPBL season, Lively returned to Mexico to pitch for the Venados de Mazatlán of the Mexican Pacific League for the 2018-19 winter season. He had a record of 3–1, 0.77 ERA, 44 strikeouts in 47 innings pitched.

On August 19, 2021, Lively signed a contract to return to the Venados de Mazatlán for the 2021 season.

Bravos de León (second stint)
On December 18, 2021, Lively signed with the Bravos de León of the Mexican League. In 8 starts, Lively posted a 2–1 record with a 8.42 ERA and 14 strikeouts over 36.1 innings. He was waived on June 17, 2022.

Diablos Rojos del México
On June 28, 2022, Lively signed with the Diablos Rojos del México of the Mexican League. In 3 starts, Lively registered a 2–1 record with a 10.64 ERA and 13 strikeouts over 11.0 innings. He was released on July 14, 2022.

El Águila de Veracruz
On August 1, 2022, Lively signed with El Águila de Veracruz of the Mexican League.

Chinatrust / CTBC Brothers
Lively signed with the Chinatrust Brothers of Taiwan's Chinese Professional Baseball League for the 2018 season. His record was 7–8, 4.05 ERA, and 119 strikeouts. In December 2018, he re-signed with the Brothers for the 2019 season. In 2019, Lively posted a 10–11 record with a 3.23 ERA and 140 strikeouts over 167 innings. He re-signed with the team, now named the CTBC Brothers, for the 2020 season. Lively pitched to a 6–1 record with a 3.94 ERA and 36 strikeouts before a shoulder injury ended his season prematurely in July. Lively again re-signed with the club for the 2021 season. However, he struggled to an 8.35 ERA and 1.88 WHIP over 36 innings, and was released by the team on July 22, 2021.

References

External links

1985 births
Águilas del Zulia players
American expatriate baseball players in Japan
American expatriate baseball players in Mexico
American expatriate baseball players in Taiwan
Arizona League Giants players
Augusta GreenJackets players
Baseball players from California
Bravos de León players
Bravos de Margarita players
Broncos de Reynosa players
Casper Rockies players
CTBC Brothers players
Connecticut Defenders players
Diablos Rojos del México players
Fresno Grizzlies players
Hokkaido Nippon-Ham Fighters players
Living people
Mexican League baseball pitchers
Navegantes del Magallanes players
American expatriate baseball players in Venezuela
Nippon Professional Baseball pitchers
Richmond Flying Squirrels players
Sacramento State Hornets baseball players
San Angelo Colts players
San Jose Giants players
Syracuse Chiefs players
Toros de Tijuana players
Vaqueros Laguna players
Venados de Mazatlán players